Benzoyl-CoA-dihydrodiol lyase (2,3-dihydro-2,3-dihydroxybenzoyl-CoA lyase/hydrolase (deformylating), BoxC, dihydrodiol transforming enzyme, benzoyl-CoA oxidation component C) is an enzyme with systematic name 2,3-dihydro-2,3-dihydroxybenzoyl-CoA 3,4-didehydroadipyl-CoA semialdehyde-lyase (formate-forming). This enzyme catalyses the following chemical reaction

 2,3-dihydro-2,3-dihydroxybenzoyl-CoA + H2O  3,4-didehydroadipyl-CoA semialdehyde + formate

The enzyme is involved in the aerobic benzoyl-CoA catabolic pathway in Azoarcus evansii.

References

External links 
 

EC 4.1.2